SoulTracks is an American online magazine that publishes music reviews, biographies and news. The website was founded in 2003 by Chris Rizik, and draws 250,000 visitors a month from 100 countries.

References

External links
 

American music websites
Internet properties established in 2003
Music review websites